Chandrabhaga Dam is an Earth fill dam located on the Chandrabhaga River near Kalmeshwar in the Nagpur District of Maharashtra, India. It was built in 1973 by the Government of Maharashtra.

Specifications
The dam is built under the "Chandrabhaga Medium Irrigation Project" which serves the purpose of irrigation in the adjoining region.

See also
 Dams in Maharashtra
 List of reservoirs and dams in India

References 

Dams in Nagpur district
Earth-filled dams
Dams completed in 1973
1973 establishments in Maharashtra
20th-century architecture in India